Super Sucker is a 2002 film featuring Jeff Daniels, Harve Presnell, and Kate Peckham.

Filmed in Jackson, Michigan, Daniels and Presnell play Fred Barlow and Winslow Schnaebelt, the heads of two different groups of door-to-door vacuum cleaner salesmen who are competing for the same territory.  Their rivalry becomes so fierce that the president of the manufacturer of the product, Mr. Suckerton, decides that for the good of the company, the town will have only one group of sales representatives.  Desperate, and always the underdog, Barlow suggests a winner-take-all sales contest to determine who gets the territory.  Well behind Schnaebelt from the very start, Barlow's sales surge when he learns of his wife's non-traditional use of a long forgotten vacuum attachment.

The film, written by Daniels, won the 2002 U.S. Comedy Arts Festival audience award for Best Feature but never obtained national distribution.

Cast
 Jeff Daniels as Fred Barlow
 Matt Letscher as Howard Butterworth
 Harve Presnell as Winslow Schnaebelt
 Dawn Wells as herself
 John Seibert as Shelby
 Guy Sanville as Leonard
 Kate Packham as Darlene
 Sandra Birch as Rhonda
 Michelle Mountain as Bunny Barlow
 Will Young as Clifford

References

External links
 
 
 
 

2002 films
2000s sex comedy films
American sex comedy films
Films set in Michigan
Films shot in Michigan
Films directed by Jeff Daniels
Films with screenplays by Jeff Daniels
2002 comedy films
2000s English-language films
2000s American films